Jim Burke (born 1973 in Manchester, New Hampshire) is an American illustrator, painter, and educator.
Burke received his BFA from Syracuse University and his MFA from the University of Hartford. Burke has lectured at Syracuse University, The Norman Rockwell Museum, and the National Baseball Hall of Fame. He formerly instructed painting and illustration at Pratt Institute, and as a visiting artist at Syracuse University. He returned to New Hampshire in Fall of 2009, when appointed Chairperson of the Illustration Department at the New Hampshire Institute of Art. In Fall 2016, Burke was appointed Assistant Vice President of Academic Affairs at the Minneapolis College of Art and Design, in Minneapolis, MN.

Publication History 
"When Thunder Comes: Poems for Civil Rights Leaders" written by J. Patrick Lewis, Chronicle Books, 2012 
“All Star!” Honus Wagner and the Most Famous Baseball Card Ever, written by Jane Yolen, Philomel/Penguin - 2010
"Miss Little's Gift" written by Douglas Wood, Candlewick Books, 2009
“Naming Liberty” written by Jane Yolen, Philomel/Penguin - 2008
“Johnny Appleseed” written by Jane Yolen, Harper Collins - 2008
“Take Me Out to the Ball Game” by Jim Burke, Little, Brown & Co. - 2006
“Maggie’s Amerikay” by Barbara Timberlake Russell, Farrar, Straus Giroux - 2006
"My Brothers' Flying Machine" by Jane Yolen, Little, Brown and Co., 2003
"Poetry for Young People; Walt Whitman"" edited by Jonathan Levin, Sterling Publishing - 1997

Recognition & Awards
New Hampshire Union Leader's "40 Under Forty", 2013 
President's Good Steward Award, Campus Compact for New Hampshire, 2013, and 2015
Gold Medal from the prestigious Society of Illustrators
Platinum and Gold Oppenheim Toy Portfolio Best Book Awards
Parent's Choice Gold Best Book Award
Original Art Show, 6 books have received Awards of Excellence
6 "Starred" Book Reviews from Booklist, School Library Journal, and Publishers Weekly
Communication Arts Award of Excellence
Print's Regional Design Award of Excellence.
23 Awards of Excellence (for Illustration) Annuals 40, 42, 43, 44, 45, 46, 47, 48, 49, 50, 51 from the Society of Illustrators 
8 Gold and Silver Medals (for Art Direction) from the Society of Illustrators

Influences 

John Sloan and George Bellows of the Ash Can SchoolEdward HopperJohn Singer SargentJames McNeill WhistlerEdgar DegasFrank Duveneck

References 

Living people
American illustrators
Syracuse University College of Visual and Performing Arts alumni
People from Manchester, New Hampshire
1973 births